John Ashurst (born 12 October 1954) is a Scottish former professional footballer. He played as a defender.

Biography
Ashurst spent the first seven years of his career with Sunderland, making 140 league appearances for the Roker Park club. In October 1979, he was signed by Stan Ternent's Blackpool for £132,400, breaking the Lancashire club's record transfer fee in the process.

Ashurst made his debut the following month, in a draw at Gillingham, replacing the veteran Peter Suddaby at centre-half.

Over the course of the next season or so, Ashurst was used as a utility player, but then suffered a series of injuries which limited his appearances.

On 21 February 1981, Ashurst scored the only goal of the game in Blackpool's league victory over Walsall at Bloomfield Road.

When former Blackpool player Allan Brown rejoined the club in a managerial capacity, he sold Ashurst to Carlisle United for £40,000 in August 1981. He went on to play for Leeds United, Doncaster Rovers and Rochdale, before moving into non-League football with Frickley Athletic with over 600 League appearances to his name. He retired from playing in the mid-1990s.

References
 

1954 births
Living people
Scottish footballers
Sunderland A.F.C. players
Blackpool F.C. players
Carlisle United F.C. players
Leeds United F.C. players
Doncaster Rovers F.C. players
Rochdale A.F.C. players
Frickley Athletic F.C. players
English Football League players
Association football defenders
People from Renton, West Dunbartonshire
Footballers from West Dunbartonshire